Eid il-Burbara or Saint  Barbara's Day, and also called the Feast of Saint Barbara, is a holiday annually celebrated on 17 December (Gregorian calendar) or 4 December (Julian calendar) amongst Middle Eastern Christians in Lebanon, Syria, Jordan, Palestine, and Turkey (Hatay Province). It is also celebrated as Barbaroba (ბარბარობა) amongst Christians in Georgia. Its celebration shares many elements with Hallowe'en, though coming from a much earlier tradition, and unrelated to the feast of the dead. Traditionally, adults and children wearing disguise go around houses in the villages dancing and singing the story of Saint Barbara; and in each house, they are offered food (and sometimes money) specially prepared for that feast. It is celebrated in honour of the Christian Saint and Martyr Saint Barbara. The general belief amongst Lebanese Christians is that Saint Barbara disguised herself as many different characters to elude the Romans who were persecuting her.

Traditions
The traditional food made on this feast is Burbara, a bowl of boiled wheat grains, pomegranate seeds, raisins, anise, and sugar. It is offered to children who go from one house to another in costumes.  In the Middle East,  Middle Eastern Christians cook a dough that is filled with walnuts or cheese. It is called Qatayef. Heavy traffic occurs in bakeries because of people buying the traditional food for this holiday. Children go trick or treating   while singing a special song for Eid il-Burbara. 

A common practice in Lebanon on Eid il-Burbara finds its source in the story of Saint Barbara who, it was believed was miraculously saved from persecution while fleeing: She ran through freshly planted wheat fields, which grew instantly to cover her path.

This miracle is celebrated symbolically by planting wheat seeds (or chick peas, barley grains, beans, lentils, etc.) in cotton wool on Saint Barbara’s feast day. The seeds germinate and grow up to around six inches in time for Christmas, when the shoots are used to decorate the nativity scene usually placed below the Christmas tree.

See also
Geography of Halloween
Kollyva
Lebanese Greek Orthodox Christians
Christianity in the Middle East
Maronites

References

 

Saints days
Festivals in Syria
Festivals in Lebanon
December observances
Festivals in the State of Palestine
Festivals in Jordan
Festivals in Turkey
Winter events in Turkey
Eastern Orthodox Christian culture
Maronite cuisine